Sara Carracelas Garcia (born 15 September 1981 in Guipúzcoa) is an S2 swimmer from Spain. She has  cerebral palsy. She started swimming when she was four years old.  She competed  at the 1996 Summer Paralympics, winning a gold medal in the 50 meter backstroke and the 50 meter freestyle. She also won a bronze  in the 100 meter freestyle. She competed at the 2000 Summer Paralympics, winning a gold medal in the 50 meter backstroke a bronze in the 50 meter freestyle and a silver in the 100 meter freestyle.  She competed at the 2004 Summer Paralympics.  She finished first in the 50 meter backstroke, the 50 meter freestyle and in the 100 meter freestyle. She raced at the 2008 Summer Paralympics, winning a bronze in the 50 meter backstroke.  In 2010, she competed at the Tenerife International Open.

References 

Living people
1981 births
Spanish female backstroke swimmers
Spanish female freestyle swimmers
Paralympic gold medalists for Spain
Paralympic silver medalists for Spain
Paralympic bronze medalists for Spain
Sportspeople from San Sebastián
Swimmers at the 1996 Summer Paralympics
Swimmers at the 2000 Summer Paralympics
Swimmers at the 2004 Summer Paralympics
Swimmers at the 2008 Summer Paralympics
Medalists at the 2008 Summer Paralympics
Medalists at the 2004 Summer Paralympics
Medalists at the 2000 Summer Paralympics
Medalists at the 1996 Summer Paralympics
Medalists at the World Para Swimming European Championships
Paralympic medalists in swimming
Paralympic swimmers of Spain
Swimmers from the Basque Country (autonomous community)
S2-classified Paralympic swimmers